Omosomopsis is a genus of prehistoric ray-finned fish from the Late Cretaceous.

It was described by Gaudant in 1978.

References
 

Acanthomorpha
Late Cretaceous fish
Prehistoric ray-finned fish genera